is a private university in Kashiwazaki, Niigata, Japan. It was established in 1995.

External links
 Official website 

Educational institutions established in 1995
Private universities and colleges in Japan
Universities and colleges in Niigata Prefecture
Engineering universities and colleges in Japan
Kashiwazaki, Niigata
1995 establishments in Japan